Race is a 2008 Indian Hindi-language action crime film directed by Abbas–Mustan and written by Kiran Kotrial and Shiraz Ahmed. It is the first installment in the Race franchise and stars Saif Ali Khan, Bipasha Basu, Akshaye Khanna, Anil Kapoor, Katrina Kaif and Sameera Reddy. In the film, the professional and personal loyalties between brothers and businessmen Ranvir (Khan) and Rajiv Singh (Khanna).

Principal photography took place in Durban, Goa and Dubai, and was produced by Tips Industries. Race was theatrically released in India by UTV Motion Pictures on March 20 2008. The film received well critical acclaim from critics, with praise for its editing, screenplay, cast performance and music. It was a commercial success, grossing  worldwide, making it the sixth highest grossing Hindi film of 2008. It was followed by the sequel film Race 2 (2013) and the spiritual successor Race 3 (2018).

Plot 
A voice-over by Inspector Robert D'Costa "RD" (Anil Kapoor) introduces the four main characters. Ranvir "Ronny" Singh (Saif Ali Khan) is a successful and powerful businessman who runs a ranch house Stallions  in Durban and fixed many horse races using finest breed of Horses. His younger brother Rajiv Singh (Akshaye Khanna) is an alcoholic. Ronny is dating an upcoming model Sonia Martin (Bipasha Basu), while his personal assistant Sophia (Katrina Kaif) appears to be secretly in love with him. Ronny is also involved in a competition with his business rival Kabir Ahuja (Dalip Tahil), who is also a horse race fixer. 

The film opens with a murder plot involving a car accident that Ronny narrowly survives. Ronny later kills his unfaithful jockey, who had been bribed by Kabir, and destroys Kabir when the latter offers to buy his company, which is in debt.

Rajiv drunkenly confesses to Ronny that he likes Sonia and would quit drinking for her. Ronny stops dating her and Rajiv and Sonia begin dating until, in a twist, Rajiv reveals that he knows of Sonia's shady past and plans to use her. His father had secured huge life insurance policies on each of the sons and he wants to kill Ronny and inherit $100 million in insurance payments. Sonia agrees to help in exchange for $20 million. 

They pretend to get married; as per Rajiv's instructions, Sonia seduces Ronny, who confesses he loved her all along. Rajiv's plan is to threaten suicide, in response to Sonia and Ronny's affair by leaping off a tall building and get Sonia to push Ronny off. It turns out Ronny was aware of the plan as Sonia had been keeping him updated, having always been in league with him. They scheme to kill Rajiv.

Sonia double-crosses Ronny and pushes him off instead, saying she loved him, but the money was more important. As RD investigates the death, Sophia reveals that she was married to Ronny, leaving Sonia shocked since Sophia is now the heir to the insurance money. In another twist, Sophia was in on the plan too and is Rajiv's secret collaborator. Rajiv plans to bump off Sonia after he and Sophia get the money. RD figures out that Sophia had faked her marriage with Ronny and he had been tricked into signing the marriage certificate. RD confronts Rajiv and agrees to remain silent in exchange for $25 million. 

Rajiv hires the same hitman who had attempted to murder Ronny in the beginning to kill Sonia, revealing that he had been behind the first murder attempt too. However, Ronny reappears and rescues her, killing the hitman.

Ronny confronts Rajiv and Sophia. He had overheard Rajiv discussing the failed murder attempt with the hitman and had been playing along the whole time so he could get the insurance money from his own faked death along with the insurance money from Rajiv's death. He allows Rajiv one last chance to win by agreeing to a car race. Ronny and Sonia show up in a yellow Toyota Supra and Rajiv and Sophia in a blue Nissan Skyline. When Rajiv protests, he switches cars with Ronny. Rajiv anticipated the switch and had destroyed the Nissan's brakes. In the middle of the race, Ronny tells Rajiv that he planted a bomb in his car and it will detonate if Rajiv slows below 100 kmph. 

As the race continues, the two cars dodge obstacles (a boat hitched to a car, a group of cyclists, two trucks in a line, etc.). As they reach a parking lot, Rajiv attempts to cross a ramp, in order to overtake Ronny. This causes the Supra to crash into a caravan, topple over and knock into a petroleum tank, killing Rajiv and Sophia. After Ronny and Sonia narrowly escape death, Ronny confesses to Sonia that there was no bomb in the car and Rajiv killed himself. He also expresses his grief in realising to what extent did Rajiv go, even destroying the brakes, to deceive and kill the former.

In the end, Ronny collects the insurance money from Rajiv and Sophia's death, along with the money from his own 'death'. He attempts to flee the city with Sonia but RD stops them. The two are revealed to be childhood friends, and RD was working with Ronny all along, in exchange for more money. Ronny gives RD a briefcase with a bomb. The bomb does not detonate, and Ronny explains that it was to prevent RD from killing Ronny and taking all the money.

Cast
Saif Ali Khan as Ranvir "Ronny" Singh, Rajiv's elder brother, a powerful businessman
Bipasha Basu as Sonia Martin Singh, a supermodel and Ranvir's love interest, later wife
Anil Kapoor as Inspector Robert D'Costa, a.k.a. RD, Ranvir's childhood friend
Akshaye Khanna as Rajiv Singh, Ranvir's younger brother
Katrina Kaif as Sophia Singh, Ranvir's secretary and Rajiv's love interest
Sameera Reddy as Mini, RD's assistant
Dalip Tahil as Kabir Ahuja, Ranvir's rival
Kiku Sharda as Sam, Ranvir's assistant
Johnny Lever as Max, marriage bureau chief (cameo appearance)
Gurpreet Ghuggi as police officer (cameo appearance)

Casting 
Saif Ali Khan originally wished to play the role of Rajiv Singh. He was offered a choice between playing Ranvir or Rajiv. The producers informed him that if he played Rajiv, then Akshay Kumar would be offered the role of Ranvir. Khan finally opted to play Ranvir. Fardeen Khan was then signed for the role of Rajiv, but he later withdrew from the film, as he was committed to Heyy Babyy (2007). At one point, Abhishek Bachchan was approached for the role of Ranvir, but things did not work out.

Soundtrack 
The soundtrack of Race was released by Tips Music on 1 March 2008. Composed by Pritam with lyrics by Sameer, Race had 7 original songs, 9 remixes and an instrumental theme. The song "Khwab Dekhe (Sexy Lady)" sung by Monali Thakur and Neeraj Shridhar was recorded after the release of the soundtrack, replacing the original song "Mujh Pe Toh Jadoo" in the film. Tips then re-distributed the soundtrack, adding "Khwab Dekhe (Sexy Lady)" after the release of the film. All the remix versions were produced by DJ Suketu feat. Aks.

Track listing

Reception

Race got favourable reviews with the song "Pehli Nazar Mein" sung by Atif Aslam as the biggest hit of the album along with "Zara Zara Touch Me" sung by Monali Thakur. Aakash Gandhi Noted "Pritam gives us a fairly solid soundtrack, reminiscent of a lot of his 2006 works. However, he doesn't quite live up to the expectations he'd set for himself last year. Although, one thing is for sure – he always manages to come up with at least one really great composition in each of his outings. This time it's Pehli Nazar Mein." while Atta Khan wrote, "the soundtrack of Race turns out to be a typical Pritam offering for a bigger profile movie; a few solid tracks that will make the intended impact on screen (especially for the promos) and could well elevate sales for the soundtrack as well. But in all other respects, it is unspectacular, unoriginal, and uninspiring, and apart from 'Pehli Nazar Mein' and a few nice remixes by DJ Suketu, it provides little scope for repeated listening". According to the Indian trade website Box Office India, with around  units sold, this film's soundtrack album was the year's fifth highest-selling.
"Race Sanson Ki" is copied from Just Like That by Tarkaan, a favourite of Pritam.

Plagiarism allegations
According to a Network 18 report, "Pehli Nazar Mein" and "Zara Zara Touch Me" were directly copied from the Korean song "Sa Rang Haeo" of Korean series Sassy Girl and Leehom Wang's "Deep Within a Bamboo Grove". Sony BMG Taiwan has issued a legal letter to Tips Industries claiming damages for the song "Zara Zara Touch Me".

Reception

Critical reception

Raja Sen gave the film 4.5 out of 5 stars, saying it was a "carnival of twists". However, Taran Adarsh gave the film 4 out of 5 stars, stating that "Race is a superb entertainer all the way", and that it "has not just style, but a lot of substance too".

Box office
Race released worldwide on 21st March, 2008, coinciding with the Holi festival weekend. It collected around ₹6.20 crore on its first day, followed by ₹6.80 crore on its second day and ₹7.50 crore on the third day, taking the three-day total to ₹20.50 crore. 

At the end of its theatrical run, the film had grossed ₹60.64 crore domestically, and ₹103.45 crore worldwide, leading the film to be declared a "HIT" by Box Office India.

Awards and nominations

Sequel

The original production team had announced plans to make a sequel called Race 2 : Betrayal Is Survival. Saif Ali Khan and Anil Kapoor returned to reprise their roles while John Abraham, Deepika Padukone, Jacqueline Fernandez and Ameesha Patel were new additions to the cast. Bipasha Basu was the only other returning member and appeared in a cameo role as Sonia. The filming for Race 2 started on 5 October 2011. It was released on 25 January 2013, and was another success, grossing over  domestically.

References

External links
 Official website
 
 

2008 films
2000s Hindi-language films
Films directed by Abbas–Mustan
2008 action thriller films
2008 crime thriller films
Films shot in the United Arab Emirates
Indian action thriller films
Indian auto racing films
Indian crime thriller films
Indian detective films
Indian horse racing films
Indian remakes of American films
Films featuring songs by Pritam
Films involved in plagiarism controversies
UTV Motion Pictures films